Mahound and Mahoun are variant forms of the name Muhammad, often found in Medieval and later European literature. The name has been used in the past by Christian writers to vilify Muhammad.  It was especially connected to the depiction of a Muhammad as a god worshipped by pagans, or a demon who inspires a false religion.

Pejorative connotations 
The perception that Muslims worshipped Muhammad was common in the Middle Ages. According to Bernard Lewis, the "development of the concept of Mahound started with considering Muhammad as a kind of demon or false god worshipped with Apollyon and Termagant in an unholy trinity in The Song of Roland. Finally, after the Reformation, Muhammad was seen as a cunning and self-seeking imposter."

A similar belief was the claim that the Knights Templar worshipped a god called Baphomet, also widely interpreted as a variant of the name "Mahommet".

In literature

The name appears in various medieval mystery plays, in which Mahound is sometimes portrayed as a generic "pagan" god worshipped by villains such as Herod and the Pharaoh of the Exodus. One play depicts both Herod the Great and his son Herod Antipas as worshipping Mahound, while in another play Pharaoh encourages the Egyptians to pursue the Israelites into the Red Sea with the words: Heave up your hearts ay to Mahound.

In Scottish popular culture, the variant form "Mahoun" was also used as the name of the devil, who was called Old Mahoun. Robert Burns wrote:
The Deil cam fiddlin thro' the town,And danc'd awa wi' th'Exciseman;And ilka wife cries auld Mahoun,I wish you luck o' the prize, man.
G. K. Chesterton uses "Mahound" rather than "Mohammed" in his poem Lepanto. More recently, Salman Rushdie, in his novel The Satanic Verses, chose the name Mahound to refer to Muhammad as he appears in one character's dreams. In reference to the Burns' poem, the novel Child of the Moon features a character named "Mahoun" who is responsible for seducing others into satanic rituals.

See also
Mohammedan
Termagant

References

External links
Companion to Medieval English Literature

Ethnic and religious slurs
Given names
Muhammad
Islam in fiction